Cranoglanis henrici is a species of armorhead catfish from China and Vietnam where it is only known from the Red River drainage.  This species reaches a length of about  SL.

References 

 

Catfish of Asia
Freshwater fish of China
Fish of Vietnam
Fish described in 1993